Elias Gaspar Pelembe (born 13 November 1983 in Maputo), also known simply as Domingues, is a Mozambican footballer who currently plays for Royal AM  in the South African Premier Soccer League and Mozambique. His position is midfielder.

Club career
Domingues, as he is nicknamed, moved to South Africa in 2007 from Desportivo Maputo. He was considered Supersport United's most influential player when they won the 2007–08 Premier Soccer League and was subsequently voted PSL Player of the Season.

During the summer of 2009, he was rumoured to be closing in on a move to one of Europe's bigger leagues as he had caught the eye of Tottenham Hotspur scouts following a string of impressive performers for club and national team. Eventually he was bought by big-spenders Mamelodi Sundowns where he was handed a substantial wage.

On 17 May 2017, Bidvest Wits were crowned 2016-17 Premier Soccer League Champions, following a 2-0 win over Polokwane City, beating his former club (Mamelodi Sundowns) in the title race. According to his coach, Gavin Hunt, Domingues was instrumental in that game. The win also meant he is now one of very few players to have won the Premier Soccer League title 4 times (with 3 different clubs), having also won 2 with Supersport United in 2007–08 Premier Soccer League and 2008–09 Premier Soccer League and 1 with Mamelodi Sundowns) in 2013–14 Premier Soccer League.

Furthermore, the win also meant he successfully completed a League and Cup double, since Bidvest Wits also won the MTN 8 title earlier in the season, with a 3-0 win over Mamelodi Sundowns at the Mbombela Stadium, on 1 October 2016.

He left Bidvest Wits at the end of the 2019–20 season. He joined Polokwane City in a free agent transfer in February 2021.

International career
He is also an influential member of his country's national team, the Black Mambas. He is currently their top scorer between players that are still actively playing.

International goals
Scores and results list Mozambique's goal tally first.

Honors 
 Premier Soccer League: 2016/17, 2013/14, 2008/09
 Nedbank Cup: 2014-15

References

External links

Bidvest Wits profile

1983 births
Living people
Mozambican footballers
Mozambican expatriate footballers
Mozambique international footballers
GD Maputo players
2010 Africa Cup of Nations players
SuperSport United F.C. players
bidvest Wits F.C. players
polokwane City F.C. players
Royal AM F.C. players
Mozambican expatriate sportspeople in South Africa
Association football midfielders
Mamelodi Sundowns F.C. players
Sportspeople from Maputo
Expatriate soccer players in South Africa